The 2017 Verrazzano Open was a professional tennis tournament played on clay courts. It was the first edition of the tournament which was part of the 2017 ATP Challenger Tour. It took place in Sophia Antipolis, France between 3 and 9 April 2017.

Point distribution

Singles main-draw entrants

Seeds

 1 Rankings are as of March 20, 2017.

Other entrants
The following players received wildcards into the singles main draw:
  Yshai Oliel
  Benoît Paire
  Lukáš Rosol
  Stefanos Tsitsipas

The following player received entry into the singles main draw as a special exempt:
  Corentin Moutet

The following players received entry from the qualifying draw:
  Mathias Bourgue
  Kimmer Coppejans
  Filip Krajinović
  Franko Škugor

The following player received entry as a lucky loser:
  Maxime Janvier

Champions

Singles

 Aljaž Bedene def.  Benoît Paire 6–2, 6–2.

Doubles

 Tristan Lamasine /  Franko Škugor def.  Uladzimir Ignatik /  Jozef Kovalík 6–2, 6–2.

References

2017 ATP Challenger Tour
2017 in French tennis